This is a list of Education Ministers of Bihar, India.

List

References

Education Ministers
Lists of government ministers of Bihar